Zimbabwean bond notes are a form of banknote in circulation in Zimbabwe. Released by the Reserve Bank of Zimbabwe, the notes were stated to not be a currency in itself but rather legal tender near money pegged equally against the U.S. dollar. In 2014, prior to the release of bond notes, a series of bond coins entered circulation.

History 

In November 2016, backed by a  loan from the African Export-Import Bank, the Reserve Bank of Zimbabwe began issuing $2 bond notes. Two months later,  worth of new five-dollar bond notes were also released.

The notes were not generally accepted by the Zimbabwean people, so the government tried expanding the electronic money supply and issuing Treasury bills instead.

The bond notes were still in circulation in 2018, although former Finance Minister Tendai Biti said that they should be demonetised, as they were being subject to arbitrage. In the campaigning for the 2018 elections, the bond notes became a political issue, with the MDC Alliance calling for their replacement with 'real cash'.

As of August 2022, the conversion rate is $361.9 bond notes to US$1.

Issued Notes

Bond Notes and the RTGS Dollar 

In February 2019, the RBZ Governor announced that the bond notes would be part of the "values" that make up the new currency to be added into the Zimbabwean market, the RTGS dollar along with the bond coins and electronic balances.

See also 

 Zimbabwean bond coins
 Zimbabwean bonds
 Zimbabwean dollar
RTGS Dollar

References 

Currencies introduced in 2016
Currencies of Africa
Currencies of Zimbabwe
Dollar